The 1987 NCAA Rifle Championships were contested at the eighth annual competition to determine the team and individual national champions of NCAA co-ed collegiate rifle shooting in the United States. The championship was held at the Xavier University Rifle Range at Xavier University in Cincinnati, Ohio.

Murray State, with a team score of 6,205, bested defending champions West Virginia in the team standings by 2 points to claim their second national title. It was the Racers' second title in three seasons.

The individual champions were, for the smallbore rifle, Web Wright (West Virginia), and, for the air rifle, Rob Harbison (Tennessee–Martin).

Qualification
Since there is only one national collegiate championship for rifle shooting, all NCAA rifle programs (whether from Division I, Division II, or Division III) were eligible. A total of seven teams ultimately contested this championship.

Results
Scoring:  The championship consisted of 120 shots by each competitor in smallbore and 40 shots per competitor in air rifle.

Team title

Individual events

References

NCAA Rifle Championship
NCAA Rifle Championships
1987 in shooting sports
NCAA Rifle Championships